Henri Nicolaas ter Veen was a Dutch social geographer. He was born in Amsterdam in 1882 in a simple workers’ family. In 1908 he became a professor of geography at the University of Amsterdam. In the 1930s he traveled to Libya, Italy, Poland, Finland, and the Soviet Union. He played an important role in popularising social geography in the Netherlands.

References 

Dutch geographers
Social geographers
1882 births
Year of death missing